Mirela Kumbaro Furxhi (born 4 March 1966 in Tirana, Albania), is an Albanian politician who is serving as  the Minister of Tourism and Environment since 18 September 2021. Previously she has served as the Minister of Culture of Albania.

She has been an associate professor since 2012 at the University of Tirana in the field of linguistics. In 2009, was made a Doctor of Science in the field of translation studies at the University of Tirana and received a master's degree in translation and intercultural communication in 1994, at the School of Interpreting and Translation at Sorbonne Nouvelle University Paris 3, France.

Furxhi completed university studies and graduated from the University of Tirana, Faculty of Foreign Languages, with papers in French, in 1988. She is a translator, publisher and international expert on intercultural projects and university research programs undertaken by international organizations like the European Union and the Organisation internationale de la Francophonie.

In the 2017 elections, she was elected as member of parliament for Gjirokastër County.

References

Living people
1966 births
Politicians from Tirana
Academic staff of the University of Tirana
French–Albanian translators
Albanian translators
University of Paris alumni
University of Tirana alumni
Albanian women writers
Albanian writers
Government ministers of Albania
Women government ministers of Albania
21st-century Albanian women politicians
21st-century Albanian politicians
21st-century translators
Culture ministers of Albania
Tourism ministers of Albania
21st-century Albanian women writers
Members of the Parliament of Albania
Women members of the Parliament of Albania